Metropolitan Park is a station on the Red line of Kaohsiung MRT in Nanzih District, Kaohsiung, Taiwan.

The station is a three-level, elevated station with one island platforms and four exits. It is 171 meters long and is located at the junction of Gaonan Highway and Cingnong Road.

Around the station
 Kaohsiung Metropolitan Park
 Taiwan Railways Administration Nanzi Station
 National Kaohsiung Marine University
 Gaonan Highway
 Kaohsiung Blood Center

References

External Links
KRTC Metropolitan Park Station

2008 establishments in Taiwan
Kaohsiung Metro Red line stations
Railway stations opened in 2008